Achnatherum lettermanii is a species of grass known by the common name Letterman's needlegrass. The updated and accepted name is Stipa lettermanii. It is native to the western United States from California to Montana to New Mexico, where it is a resident of several types of habitat.

Achnatherum lettermanii is a tufting perennial bunchgrass which forms large clumps of erect stems up to about 80 centimeters tall. The leaves are short and slightly curly. The inflorescence is up to about 19 centimeters long and has open branches with few spikelets. Each spikelet is less than a centimeter long but has an awn which can be up to about 2.5 centimeters in length. The awn has two kinks.

References

External links
Jepson Manual Treatment - Achnatherum lettermanii
USDA Plants Profile
Ecology
Grass Manual Treatment
Achnatherum lettermanii - Photo gallery

lettermanii
Bunchgrasses of North America
Native grasses of California
Grasses of the United States
Flora of the Great Basin
Flora of Idaho
Flora of Nevada
Flora of New Mexico
Flora of Oregon
Flora of the Sierra Nevada (United States)
Natural history of the Transverse Ranges